Nymphicula luzonensis is a moth in the family Crambidae. It was described by Yoshiyasu in 1997. It is found in the Philippines (Luzon).

References

Nymphicula
Moths described in 1997